The Hold Street Marketplace or Market Hall V, now officially known as Downtown Market, is one of the six great Budapest market halls built under the monarchy.

The building between Moon Street and Vadász Street in the 5th District was built between 1892 and 1896 as the No. 5 marketplace by Győző Czigler. The 2107 m² eclectic-style hall had 190 permanent and 80 temporary stores, as well as police and rescue rooms, a coffee shop, a fairgrounds, and a restaurant and a meat test room.

In 2014, the Market Hall was renovated and renamed the Downtown Market. Today it operates primarily as a producer market.

Gallery

Sources 
 http://5.kerulet.ittlakunk.hu/holmi/uzletek/belvarosi-piac-hold-utcai-vasarcsarnok
 https://web.archive.org/web/20160419123833/http://welovebudapest.com/uzletek.szolgaltatasok/elelmiszer.boltok.es.piacok/belvarosi.piac.hold.utcai.piac
 http://urbface.com/budapest/az-v--vasarcsarnok
 http://www.bpht.hu/historiak/77.pdf

Buildings and structures in Budapest
Tourist attractions in Budapest
Retail markets in Hungary
Commercial buildings completed in 1896